Ghadirderaz (also Romanized as Ghadīrderāz) is a village in Nakhlestan Rural District, in the Central District of Kahnuj County, Kerman Province, Iran. At the 2006 census, its population was 276, in 66 families.

References 

Populated places in Kahnuj County